Jack O'Brien (25 September 1887 – 8 March 1959) was an Australian rules footballer who played for Essendon and Fitzroy in the Victorian Football League (VFL).

A premiership player in his debut season, O'Brien played from the back pocket in Essendon's 1912 VFL Grand Final triumph. He was also used as a follower and returned to his original club South Ballarat for the second half of the 1913 season. After playing at Fitzroy in 1917 and 1918, O'Brien crossed to Northcote in 1919.

References

Holmesby, Russell and Main, Jim (2007). The Encyclopedia of AFL Footballers. 7th ed. Melbourne: Bas Publishing.

1887 births
1959 deaths
Essendon Football Club players
Essendon Football Club Premiership players
Fitzroy Football Club players
Northcote Football Club players
South Ballarat Football Club players
Australian rules footballers from Victoria (Australia)
One-time VFL/AFL Premiership players